The Dark is a 2005 folk horror film starring Sean Bean and Maria Bello and directed by John Fawcett. It is based on the 1994 novel Sheep by Simon Maginn.  The film was shot on the Isle of Man.

Plot 
While in Wales visiting her husband James (Sean Bean), Adèlle (Maria Bello) tries to fix her relationship with her daughter Sarah (Sophie Stuckey). By the side of a cliff, they see a strange memorial with evidence of a plate missing and with the name "Annwyn" marked on it. A local man Dafydd (Maurice Roëves) explains that, according to traditional Welsh mythology, Annwyn is a sort of afterlife.

Later, Sarah vanishes on the beach, and another similar looking girl, named Ebrill (Welsh for "April"), appears in her place. Ebrill is the long-dead daughter of a local shepherd who also served as the town's pastor fifty years prior.  When Ebrill, who was a sickly child, died, her father gave her to the ocean, sending her to Annwyn.  He then convinced his followers to throw themselves into the ocean, claiming that it was the way to Paradise, while he privately hoped that their sacrifice would return Ebrill to him from Annwyn.  Ebrill did come back, but, something came back with her.  Her father tried to draw the evil out of her, through trepanning and locking her in her room.  Dafydd was one of the followers who did not throw himself off the cliff, though both his parents did.  Ebrill's father took him in, and when Dafydd could no longer bear witnessing the shepherd hurting Ebrill, he set her free, which in turn allowed the evil within her to lash out and shove her father over the cliff.

Adèlle makes the connection that Ebrill is back once more because she has found a living substitute in Sarah.  In an attempt to rescue her daughter, Adèlle throws both herself and Ebrill over the cliffs, despite James' protests, and sends them both to Annwyn, a sepia-toned, misty version of reality.  While in Annwyn, the film reveals that (prior to the events of the film) Sarah attempted suicide following an argument with her mother, resulting in their trip to Wales.  Adèlle begs for a second chance with her daughter.  Ebrill informs her that the dead don't get second chances.  Ebrill and her father perform trepanation on Adèlle, to draw out the evil within her.  Adèlle eventually escapes her bonds and rushes to find Sarah, who is locked behind a door.  Adèlle finds a key and tearfully apologizes for being so selfish.  In unlocking the door, Adèlle is able to rescue Sarah from Annwyn, though, in doing so, Adèlle sacrificed herself, only to realize too late that the Sarah she brought back was tainted by the same evil that had tainted Ebrill all those years ago.

Cast 
 Sean Bean — James
 Maria Bello — Adèlle
 Richard Elfyn — Rowan
 Maurice Roëves — Dafydd
 Abigail Stone — Ebrill
 Sophie Stuckey — Sarah
 Caspar Harvey — Young Dafydd

Critical reception

The review aggregator website Rotten Tomatoes surveyed  and, categorizing the reviews as positive or negative, assessed four as positive and six as negative for a 40% rating. Among the reviews, it determined an average rating of 4.70 out of 10.

DVD 
The DVD was released on 11 April 2007. The soundtrack features a song by Stream of Passion sung by Marcela Bovio.

References

External links 
 
 

2005 films
2005 horror films
British horror films
German horror films
Welsh films
English-language German films
English-language Welsh films
Folk horror films
Films based on British novels
Films directed by John Fawcett
Films produced by Paul W. S. Anderson
British ghost films
British supernatural horror films
2000s British films
2000s German films